Acacia semilunata is a shrub or tree belonging to the genus Acacia and the subgenus Phyllodineae native to north eastern Australia.

Description
It has terete branchlets that can be covered in a fine white powdery coating. The branchlets are rarely glabrous and more often sparsely to moderately pubescent with  spreading, straight hairs. Like most species of Acacia it has phyllodes rather than true leaves. The thin grey-green phyllodes look crowded on their stem projections and usually have an inequilaterally narrowly elliptic to oblong-oblanceolate shape. The racemose inflorescences are aggregated in the upper axils and have sperical flower-heads containing 15 to 20 golden flowers.

Distribution
It is endemic only in a small area in south eastern Queensland from around Knockbreak Station in the north to near Stanthorpe in the south where it is found on low rocky hills growing in sandy-loamy soils as a part of open Eucalyptus woodland communities.

See also
 List of Acacia species

References

semilunata
Flora of Queensland
Plants described in 1927
Taxa named by Joseph Maiden
Taxa named by William Blakely